Cher is an American singer, actress, producer, author and philanthropist. She has been honored with numerous worldwide awards and accolades recognizing her success in music, television, fashion and film, both as a solo artist and as part of Sonny & Cher. She has also been honored for her humanitarian and charity work. She has won an Academy Award, a Grammy Award, an Emmy Award, three Golden Globe Awards, and the Best Actress Award at the Cannes Film Festival, making her one of few artists to have received those top honors. Cher is also the only artist to date to have achieved a number-one single on a Billboard chart in each of the past six decades.<ref name="billboard.com">[http://www.billboard.com/articles/news/473595/cher-shines-with-no-1-in-sixth-consecutive-decade Caulfield, Keith. "Cher Shines with No. 1 in Sixth Consecutive Decade, 18 January 2011]</ref> A 2002 Rolling Stone article estimated her wealth at over $600 million. Since then she has embarked on several hugely successful concert tours and released several albums that have spent numerous weeks on the Billboard's albums chart. Cher is a Tony Award away from achieving the EGOT status (Emmy, Grammy, Oscar, and Tony) which is considered the "grand slam" of American show business.

Complete awards and nominations history:

Academy Awards
The Academy Awards, or Oscars, is an annual American awards ceremony honoring cinematic achievements in the film industry, and is organised by the Academy of Motion Picture Arts and Sciences (AMPAS). Cher has won one award from two nominations.

!
|-
|1984
|Silkwood|Best Supporting Actress
|
|style="text-align:center;" |
|-
|1988
|Moonstruck|Best Actress
|
|style="text-align:center;" |

 Cher was a featured vocalist on two songs nominated in the Best Original Song category, (Alfie in 1967 and After All in 1989), but those nominations are credited to the songwriters and not the performer.

Advertising Age Magazine Awards
Advertising Age is a global media brand publishing analysis, news and data on marketing and media. Its namesake magazine, Advertising Age, was started as a broadsheet newspaper in Chicago in 1930. Cher has been awarded the coveted  'Cover Derby' award for appearing on more than 25 magazine covers in one year.

!
|-
|1988
|Cher
|Cover Derby Award
|
|style="text-align:center;"|

AGVA Entertainer of the Year Awards
American Guild of Variety Artists awarded the Entertainer of the Year Awards, or the "Georgie Award" (after George M. Cohan), to best variety performers and entertainers of the year. As part of Sonny & Cher, she has won three awards.

!
|-
|1972
| rowspan="3"|Sonny & Cher
|Musical Group of the Year
|
|style="text-align:center;" |
|-
|1973
| rowspan="2"|Vocal Act of the Year
|
|style="text-align:center;" rowspan="2"|
|-
|1974
|

Alliance of Women Film Journalists – EDA Female Focus Award
The "Alliance of Women Film Journalists" (AWFJ) is a New York non-profit organization founded in 2006 dedicated to supporting work by and about women in the film industry. Beginning in 2007, the group annually gives awards as voted on by its members. Cher has been nominated once.

!
|-
|2010
|Cher
|Perseverance Award
|
|style="text-align:center;" |

Amadeus Austrian Music Awards
The "Amadeus Austrian Music Awards", founded in 2000, is the annual awards ceremony for excellence in the Austrian music industry. Cher has been nominated once.

!
|-
|2000
|Cher
|Best International Artist
|
|style="text-align:center;" |

American Comedy Awards
The American Comedy Awards are a group of awards presented annually in the United States recognizing performances and performers in the field of comedy, with an emphasis on television comedy and comedy films. Cher has been nominated once.

!
|-
|1988
|Moonstruck|Funniest Actress in a Movie – Leading Role
|
|style="text-align:center;" |

American Music Awards
Created by Dick Clark in 1973, the American Music Awards is an annual music awards ceremony and a major annual music awards shows. Cher has been nominated three times.

!
|-
|2000
| rowspan="3"|Cher
| Favorite Adult Contemporary Artist
| 
|style="text-align:center;"| 
|-
| rowspan="2"|2003
| Favorite Adult Contemporary Artist
| 
|style="text-align:center;" rowspan="2"| 
|-
| International Artist of the Year
| 
|-

amfAR Awards
The amfAR awards are given by the American Foundation for AIDS Research to individuals who support the fight against AIDS through activism and charity. Cher has been honored once.

!
|-
!scope="row"|2015
|Cher
|Inspiration Award
|
|style="text-align:center;" |

Anděl Awards
The Anděl Award is a Czech music award issued by the Czech Academy of Popular Music. Cher has won once.

!
|-
!scope="row"|1999
|Cher
|Best Foreign Female Singer
|
|style="text-align:center;" |

Armenia Music Awards
The Armenia Music Awards, called the Tashir Armenia Music Awards until 2011, are presented to the best representatives of Armenian music and culture since 2006. Cher has received an honorary Legend Award at the 2008 ceremony and was nominated again in 2014.

!
|-
|2008
| rowspan="2"|Cher
| rowspan="2"|Legend Award
|
|style="text-align:center;" |
|-
|2014
|
|style="text-align:center;" |

ARTISTdirect Online Music Awards
The ARTISTdirect Online Music Awards were organized to recognize artists, bands and websites based entirely on fans' input through online voting. Cher has been nominated once.

!
|-
!scope="row"|1999
|Cher
|Favorite Female Artist
|
|style="text-align:center;" |

Attitude Awards
The Attitude Awards are hosted by Attitude magazine, a British gay publication, honoring individuals who have been an inspiration and an ally to the LGBT community. Cher has been honored once.

!
|-
!scope="row"|2013
|Cher
|Legend Award
|
|style="text-align:center;" |

Australian LGBTI Awards
The Australian LGBTI Awards are designed to showcase individuals and organisations that have demonstrated an outstanding commitment to the LGBTI community. Cher has been nominated once.

!
|-
|align="center"| 2018
|Cher
|International Icon
|
|style="text-align:center;"|
|}

BAFTA Awards
The British Academy Film Awards (BAFTA Awards) are presented by the British Academy of Film and Television Arts. They are the UK equivalent to the Academy Awards. Cher has been nominated twice.

!
|-
|1985
|Silkwood|Best Actress in a Supporting Role
|
|style="text-align:center;" rowspan="2"| 
|-
|1989
|Moonstruck|Best Actress in a Leading Role
|
|-

Bambi Awards
The Bambi Awards is a German awards ceremony that recognizes excellence in international media and television "with vision and creativity who affected and inspired the German public that year", both domestic and foreign. Cher has won once.

!
|-
!scope="row"|2001
|Cher
|International Pop Artist
|
|style="text-align:center;"| 

Best of Las Vegas Awards
The annual Las Vegas Review-Journal's Best of Las Vegas Awards are given to the best headliners and shows in Las Vegas. Cher has won twice out of four nominations.

!
|-
|2010
|rowspan="4"|Cher
|Best All-Around Performer
|
|style="text-align:center;" |
|-
|2011
|Best Singer
|
|style="text-align:center;" |
|-
|2017
|Best Resident Performer / Headliner
|
|style="text-align:center;" |
|-
|2018
|Best Resident Performer
|
|style="text-align:center;" |

Billboard Awards

Billboard Music Awards
The Billboard Music Awards is an honor given by Billboard, the preeminent publication covering the music business. The Billboard Music Awards had been held annually since December 1989 until it went dormant in 2007, but it returned in May 2011. Cher has won two competitive awards from four nominations, as well as two honorary Billboard Awards.

!
|-
| rowspan="3"|1999
|Believe|Hot 100 Single of the Year
| 
|style="text-align:center;"| 
|-
| rowspan="5"|Cher
|Top Female Artist
| 
|style="text-align:center;" rowspan="2"| 
|-
|Female Hot 100 Artist of the Year
| 
|-
| rowspan="2"| 2002
| Artist Achievement Award
| 
|style="text-align:center;" rowspan="2"|
|-
|Dance/Club Play Artist of the Year
| 
|-
| 2017
| Icon Award
| 
|style="text-align:center;"|

Billboard Music Video Awards
The Billboard Music Video Awards were given by Billboard magazine to the best music videos of the year. Cher has been nominated once.

!
|-
|1999
|Believe|Best Dance Clip
| 
|style="text-align:center;"| 

Billboard Magazine

!
|-
|1965
|Sonny & Cher
|Special Award
| 
|style="text-align:center;" |

Billboard Year-End Chart Awards
The Billboard Year-End Chart Awards are published annually to honor the artists in many categories announced by Billboard both in the press and as part of their year-end issue. As a solo artist and as part of Sonny & Cher, she has appeared a total of seventy-four times on Billboard's Year-End Charts Award lists (note that only the top 20 entries are listed).

!
|-
| rowspan="2"| 1965
|Cher
| Top Singles Artists – #4
| 
|style="text-align:center;" rowspan="2"| 
|-
| I Got You Babe| Top Pop Singles – #16
| 
|-
|1966
| rowspan="4"| Sonny & Cher
| Top 10 International Artists by Country – #7 (Belgium)
| 
|style="text-align:center;"| 
|-
| rowspan="2"|1967
| Top 10 International Artists by Country – #1 (Finland)
| 
|style="text-align:center;" rowspan="2"| 
|-
| Top 10 International Artists by Country – #4 (Singapore)
| 
|-
|1968
| Top 10 International Artists by Country – #9 (Philippines)
| 
|style="text-align:center;"| 
|-
|1971
| rowspan="6"|  Cher
| Top Singles Female Vocalists – #10
| 
|style="text-align:center;"| 
|-
| rowspan="10"|1972
| Top Singles Artists – #16
| 
|style="text-align:center;" rowspan="10"|
|-
| Top Album Artists – #5
| 
|-
| Top Singles Female Vocalists – #2
| 
|-
| Top Album Female Vocalists – #3
| 
|-
| Top Singles Easy Listening Artists – #2
| 
|-
| rowspan="4"|Sonny & Cher
| Top Album Artists – #17
| 
|-
| Top Singles Easy Listening Artists – #5
| 
|-
| Top Singles Duos & Groups – #11
| 
|-
| Top Album Duos & Groups – #8
| 
|-
|All I Ever Need Is You| Top Easy Listening Singles – #7
| 
|-
| rowspan="2"|  1973
|Half-Breed| Top Pop Singles – #20
| 
|style="text-align:center;" rowspan="2"| 
|-
| rowspan="12"|  Cher
| Top Singles Female Vocalists – #10
| 
|-
| rowspan="4"|  1974
| Top Pop Singles Artists – #20
| 
|style="text-align:center;" rowspan="4"|
|-
| Top Pop Singles Female Vocalists – #4
| 
|-
| Top Pop Albums Female Artists – #14
| 
|-
| Top Singles Easy Listening Artists – #8
| 
|-
| rowspan="2"|  1979
| Top Female Single Artists – #8
| 
|style="text-align:center;" rowspan="2"|
|-
| Top Overall Female Artists – #18
| 
|-
| rowspan="2"|1988
| Top Pop Singles Artists – Female – #9
| 
|style="text-align:center;" rowspan="2"|
|-
| Top Pop Album Artists – Female – #12
| 
|-
| rowspan="5"|1989
| Top Pop Singles Artists – #20
| 
|style="text-align:center;" rowspan="5"|
|-
| Top Pop Singles Artists – Female – #8
| 
|-
| Top Pop Album Artists – Female – #13
| 
|-
| Cher & Peter Cetera
|Top Adult Contemporary Artists – #17
| 
|-
| After All|  Top Adult Contemporary Singles  – #5
| 
|- 
| rowspan="2"|1990
| rowspan="12"| Cher
| Top Pop Singles Artists – Female – #12
| 
|style="text-align:center;" rowspan="2"|
|- 
|Top Pop Album Artists – Female – #11
| 
|- 
| rowspan="2"|1991
| Top Pop Singles Artists – Female – #17
| 
|style="text-align:center;" rowspan="2"|
|- 
|Top Adult Contemporary Artists – #13
| 
|- 
| rowspan="20"|1999
|Top Pop Artists – #7
| 
|style="text-align:center;" rowspan="20"|
|-
|Top Hot 100 Singles Artists – #8
| 
|-
|Top Billboard 200 Album Artists – Female – #8
| 
|-
|Top Hot Adult Contemporary Artists – #10
| 
|-
|Top Pop Artists – Female – #3
| 
|-
|Top Hot 100 Singles Artists – Female – #2
| 
|-
|Top Hot Dance Club-Play Artists – #1
|
|-
|Top Hot Dance Maxi-Singles Sales Artists – #1
|
|-
|Believe|Top Billboard 200 Albums – #17
| 
|-
| rowspan="8"|Believe| Top Hot 100 Singles – #1
| 
|-
|Top Hot 100 Singles Sales – #1
|
|-
|Top Hot Dance Club-Play Singles – #1
|
|-
|Top Hot Dance Maxi-Singles Sales – #1
|
|-
|Top Hot 100 Singles Airplay – #12
| 
|-
|Top Hot Adult Contemporary Tracks – #9
| 
|-
| Top Hot Top 40 Tracks – #10
| 
|-
| Top Hot Adult Top 40 Tracks – #18
| 
|-
|Strong Enough|Top Hot Dance Maxi-Singles Sales – #14
| 
|-
|All or Nothing|Top Hot Dance Club-Play Singles – #4
| 
|-
|Do You Believe? Tour|Top Tours – #6
| 
|-
| 2000
| rowspan="3"| Cher
|Top Hot Dance Maxi-Singles Sales Artists – #10
| 
|style="text-align:center;"|
|-
| rowspan="6"|2002
|Top Hot Dance Club Play Artists – #1
| 
|style="text-align:center;" rowspan="6"|
|-
|Top Hot Dance Maxi-Singles Sales Artists – #2
| 
|-
| Living Proof: The Farewell Tour|Top 25 Tours – #2
| 
|-
|Song for the Lonely|Top Hot Dance Maxi-Single Sales – #3
| 
|-
|rowspan="2"|A Different Kind of Love Song|Top Hot Dance Club Play Singles – #7
| 
|-
|Top Hot Dance Maxi-Single Sales – #13
| 
|-
| rowspan="4"|2003
| Cher
| Top Billboard 200 Album Artists – Female – #8
| 
|style="text-align:center;" rowspan="4"|
|-
| Living Proof: The Farewell Tour|Top 25 Tours – #3
| 
|-
|The Very Best of Cher|Top Internet Albums – #8
| 
|-
|When the Money's Gone|Top Hot Dance Singles Sales – #19
| 
|-
| rowspan="1"|2005
|| Living Proof: The Farewell Tour|Top 25 Tours – #14
| 
|style="text-align:center;"|
|-
| rowspan="1"|2011
|Burlesque|Top Soundtrack Albums – #3
| 
|style="text-align:center;"|
|-
| rowspan="1"|2013
| rowspan="2"|Closer to the Truth|Top Internet Albums – #4
| 
|style="text-align:center;"|
|-
| rowspan="4"|2014
|Top Internet Albums – #13
| 
|style="text-align:center;"|
|-
|Cher
|Top Hot Dance Club Play Artists – #5
| 
|style="text-align:center;"|
|-
|Dressed to Kill Tour|Top 25 Tours – #18
| 
|style="text-align:center;"|
|-
|I Walk Alone|Top Dance Club Songs – #13
| 
|style="text-align:center;"|
|-
| rowspan="2"|2018
|Dancing Queen|Top Internet Albums – #10
| 
|style="text-align:center;"|
|-
|Mamma Mia! Here We Go Again: The Movie Soundtrack|Top Soundtrack Albums – #7
| 
|style="text-align:center;"|
|-
|2019
|rowspan="2"|Here We Go Again Tour|Top Tours – #11
| 
|style="text-align:center;"|
|-
|2020
|Top Tours – #12
| 
|style="text-align:center;"|

Blockbuster Entertainment Awards
The Blockbuster Entertainment Awards are organized by Blockbuster Inc. in 1995. Cher has won once.

!
|-
| 2000
|Cher
| Favorite Female Artist (Pop)
| 
|style="text-align:center;"|

Bravo Otto
A German accolade honoring excellence of performers in music, film, television and sport. Presented annually since 1957, winners are selected by the readers of Bravo magazine. The award winners are presented with a Gold, Silver and Bronze statue. Cher has won twice out of twelve nominations.

!
|-
|1966
| rowspan="2"|Sonny & Cher
|Best Group
|
|style="text-align:center;" |
|-
|1967
|Best Group
|
|style="text-align:center;" |
|-
|1972
| rowspan="5"|Cher
| Best Female Singer (Pop) 
|
|style="text-align:center;" |
|-
|1988
| Best Actress
| 
|style="text-align:center;" |
|-
| rowspan="5"|1991
| Best Female Singer (Pop) – Silver Award
| 
|style="text-align:center;" |
|-
| Best-Looking Female Singer
| 
|style="text-align:center;" |
|-
| Best Actress
| 
|style="text-align:center;" |
|-
|Love Hurts| Best LP
| 
|style="text-align:center;" |
|-
|Love Hurts Tour| Best Show
| 
|style="text-align:center;" |
|-
| rowspan="3"|1992
|Cher
| Best Female Singer (Pop)
| 
| rowspan="3" style="text-align:center;" |
|-
|Love Hurts| Best LP
| 
|-
|Love Hurts Tour| Best Show
| 

British LGBT Awards
The British LGBT Awards is designed to showcase individuals and organizations that have demonstrated an outstanding commitment to the LGBT community. Cher has received one nomination.

!
|-
| 2016
| Cher
| Global Icon
| 
|style="text-align:center;"|

Broadway Showbiz Awards
The Broadway Showbiz Awards are independent awards honoring Broadway, film and animation productions and performers. Cher has been honored once.

!
|-
|2019
|Cher
|Broadway Showbiz Icon Award
|
|style="text-align:center;"|

Broadway World Las Vegas Awards
The Broadway World Las Vegas Awards are presented annually to honor the top Las Vegas performers and shows. Cher has won once.

!
|-
|2011
|Cher|Best Resident Show
|
|style="text-align:center;"|

CableACE Awards
The CableACE Awards were inaugurated in 1979 by the National Cable Television Association to honor achievements in cable programming and to serve as a cable television counterpart to the Primetime Emmy Awards. Cher has won once.

!
|-
| 1983
| Cher: A Celebration at Caesars| Best Actress in a Variety Program
| 
|style="text-align:center;" |

California Music Awards
Formerly known as the Bammy Awards, the ceremony was established in 1978 by "BAM" (Bay Area Music) magazine editor Dennis Erokan to honor the musicians of San Francisco. In 1998 it expended and transformed into California Music Awards honoring significant musical contributions made by Californian artists.2003 California Music Awards  SideWalksTV. 2003-05-25. Retrieved 2009-09-15. Cher was nominated once.

!
|-
| 2000
|Cher
|Outstanding Female Vocalist
|
|style="text-align:center;" |

Cannes Film Festival
The Cannes Film Festival is a celebration of cinematographic art held annually since 1939. Cher has won once.

!
|-
| 1985
| Mask| Best Actress
| 
|style="text-align:center;" |

Cash Box Magazine Awards
Cash Box magazine was a weekly publication devoted to the music and coin-operated machine industries which was published from July 1942 to November 16, 1996. It was one of several magazines that published charts of song popularity in the United States. Cher, both solo and with Sonny, has been listed twenty-six times.

!
|-
| rowspan="2"| 1965
|Cher 
| New Female Vocalists (Albums) – #2
|
|style="text-align:center;" rowspan="2"|
|-
| Sonny & Cher 
| New Vocal Groups (Albums) – #2
|
|-
| rowspan="4"| 1966
| rowspan="2"|Cher
| Best Female Vocalists (Singles) – #5
|
|style="text-align:center;" rowspan="4"|
|-
| Best Female Vocalists (Albums) – #4
|
|-
| rowspan="2"|Sonny & Cher 
| Best Vocal Groups (Singles) – #40
|
|-
| Best Vocal Groups (Albums) – #11
|
|-
| rowspan="2"| 1967
|Cher
| Best Female Vocalists (Albums) – #6
|
|style="text-align:center;" rowspan="2"|
|-
|Sonny & Cher 
| Best Vocal Groups (Albums) – #19
|
|-
| 1968
|Cher
| Best Female Vocalists (Albums) – #12
|
|style="text-align:center;|
|-
| rowspan="3"| 1971
| rowspan="2"|Cher
| Female Vocalists (Singles) – #8
|
|style="text-align:center;" rowspan="3"|
|-
| Female Vocalists (Albums) – #11
|
|-
|Sonny & Cher 
| Duos (Singles) – #6
|
|-
| rowspan="4"| 1972
| rowspan="2"|Cher
| Female Vocalists (Singles) – #2
|
|style="text-align:center;" rowspan="4"|
|-
| Female Vocalists (Albums) – #5
|
|-
| rowspan="2"|Sonny & Cher 
| Duos (Singles) – #2
|
|-
| Duos (Albums) – #3
|
|-
| rowspan="2"| 1973
| rowspan="2"|Cher
| Female Vocalists (Singles) – #7
|
|style="text-align:center;" rowspan="2"|
|-
| Female Vocalists (Albums) – #14
|
|-
| rowspan="2"| 1974
| rowspan="2"|Cher
| Female Vocalists (Singles) – #2
|
|style="text-align:center;" rowspan="2"|
|-
| Female Vocalists (Albums) – #10
|
|-
| rowspan="3"| 1979
| rowspan="2"|Cher
| Female Vocalists (Disco) – #11
|
|style="text-align:center;" rowspan="3"|
|-
| Top Pop Crossover (Black Contemporary Singles) – #4
|
|-
|Take Me Home| Top Disco Records – #27
|
|-
| rowspan="3"| 1989
|Cher
| Top A/C Female Artists – #4
|
|style="text-align:center;" rowspan="3"|
|-
|Heart Of Stone| Top 50 Pop Albums – #42
|
|-
| If I Could Turn Back Time| Top 50 Pop Singles – #24
|
|-

CFDA Fashion Awards
The CFDA Fashion Awards, often called "the Oscars of Fashion", were presented annually by the Council of Fashion Designers of America honoring excellence in fashion design. Cher has been honored once.

!
|-
| 1999
| Cher
|Influence on Fashion Award
| 
|style="text-align:center;" |

Chita Rivera Awards
The Chita Rivera Awards is an annual event that recognizes dance and choreographic excellence on Broadway, Off-Broadway and in film. Cher has won once.

!
|-
| 2019
| Cher
| Ambassador for the Arts Award
| 
|style="text-align:center;" |

CinEuphoria Awards
CinEuphoria Awards is a Portuguese honor given to both national and international cinematographic productions and performers. Cher has won once.

!
|-
|align="center"| 2020
|Cher
|Career - Honorary Award
|
|style="text-align:center;"|
|}

Creem Magazine Awards
Creem magazine was dubbed "America's Only Rock 'n' Roll Magazine" and it issued year-end poll awards based on readers' votes in the 1970s and 1980s. Cher has been a finalist twice.

!
|-
|1975
|Cher
|Fashion Plate of the Year
|
|style="text-align:center;" rowspan="2" |
|-
|1977
|Cher and Gregg Allman
|Couple of the Year 
|

Critics' Choice Documentary Awards
The "Critics' Choice Documentary Awards" is an awards show presented annually by the Broadcast Film Critics Association (BFCA) to honor the finest in cinematic achievement of documentary format. Cher has been nominated once.

!
|-
|2017
|Prayers For This World|Best Song in a Documentary
|
|style="text-align:center;" |

Critics' Choice Movie Awards
The "Critics' Choice Movie Awards" (formerly known as the Broadcast Film Critics Association Award) is an awards show presented annually by the Broadcast Film Critics Association (BFCA) to honor the finest in cinematic achievement. Cher has been nominated once.

!
|-
|2011
|You Haven't Seen the Last of Me|Best Original Song
|
|style="text-align:center;"|

Dallas Times Herald
The "Dallas Times Herald" founded in 1888 was once one of two major daily newspapers serving the Dallas, Texas (USA) area. Sonny and Cher received a special award honoring their charity efforts.

!
|-
|1972
|Sonny & Cher
|Special Dallas Times Award
|
|style="text-align:center;" |

Danish Grammy Awards
The Danish Music Awards, called the Danish Grammy until 2001, is an annual ceremony arranged by IFPI since 1989. Cher has won once.

!
|-
!scope="row"|1999
|Believe|Best International Hit
|
|style="text-align:center;" |

David di Donatello Awards
The David di Donatello Award is a film award presented each year for cinematic performances and production by The Academy of Italian Cinema. Cher has won once.

!
|-
|1988
|Moonstruck|Best Foreign Actress
|
|style="text-align:center;" |

Disc Magazine Awards
Disc magazine awarded Silver Disc Awards (for sales of 250,000) and Gold Disc Awards (for sales of 1,000,000) in the UK from 1959 until 1973, based on sales figures submitted by record companies. Cher has won twice.

!
|-
|1965
|I Got You Babe  
|rowspan="2"|Silver Disc Award
|
|style="text-align:center;" rowspan="2" |
|-
|1971
|Gypsys, Tramps & Thieves|

Discomania Magazine Awards
Discomania magazine was a Spanish music publication which held annual readers' poll awards honoring the top musical artists. As part of Sonny & Cher, she has been nominated once.

!
|-
|1966
|Sonny & Cher
|Foreign Pop Group
|
|style="text-align:center;" |

Drama League Awards
The Drama League Awards, created in 1922, honor distinguished productions and performances both on Broadway and Off-Broadway, in addition to recognizing exemplary career achievements in theatre, musical theatre, and directing. As a producer of The Cher Show, Cher has been nominated once.

!
|-
| 2019
| The Cher Show| Outstanding Production of a Broadway or Off-Broadway Musical
| 
|style="text-align:center;"|

ECHO Awards
The ECHO Award is a German equivalent to the Grammy Awards granted every year by the Deutsche Phono-Akademie, an association of recording companies. Cher won two awards out of three nominations.

!
|-
|1992
|rowspan="3"|Cher
|rowspan="3"|International Female Artist
|
|style="text-align:center;" rowspan="3"| 
|-
|1993
|
|-
|2000
|
|-

Emmy Awards
Primetime Emmy Awards
The Emmy Award recognizes excellence in the television industry, and corresponds to the Academy Award (for film), the Tony Award (for theatre), and the Grammy Award (for music). Cher has received one award from seven nominations.

!
|-
|rowspan="2"|1972
| rowspan="4"|The Sonny & Cher Comedy Hour|Outstanding Variety Series – Musical
|
|style="text-align:center;" rowspan="7"|
|-
| Outstanding Single Program – Variety or Musical – Variety and Popular Music
|
|-
|1973
|Outstanding Variety Musical Series
|
|-
|1974
|Outstanding Music-Variety Series
|
|-
|1975
|Cher|Outstanding Comedy-Variety or Music Series
|
|-
|2000
|Cher – Live in Concert|Outstanding Individual Performance in a Variety or Music Program
|
|-
|2003
|Cher: The Farewell Tour|Outstanding Variety, Music or Comedy Special
|

News & Documentary Emmy Awards
The News & Documentary Emmy Awards are presented by the National Academy of Television Arts & Sciences (NATAS) in recognition of excellence in American national news and documentary programming. As an executive producer, Cher has been nominated once.

!
|-
!scope="row"|2018
|Edith+Eddie|Outstanding Short Documentary
|
|style="text-align:center;" |

Expodisc Awards
Expodisc was an exposition of international recording hardware and software, which together with the Miami Beach International Song Festival, honored performers, actors, singers, composers, etc. at international level. Cher has been nominated once.

!
|-
|align="center"| 1972
|Cher
|Superstar Award
|
|style="text-align:center;"|
|}

Focus on Video Awards
The Focus on Video Awards were given out to video releases in a variety of categories during Canadian video trade show and convention. Cher has received two awards for her fitness videos.

!
|-
|!scope="row"|1992
|Cher Fitness: A New Attitude| rowspan="2"|Best How to Instructional Video
|
|style="text-align:center;" |
|-
|!scope="row"|1993
|Cher Fitness: Body Confidence|
|style="text-align:center;" |
|-

Fragrance Foundation Awards
The Fragrance Foundation awards or the FiFi awards, known as the "Oscars of the fragrance industry", are an annual event sponsored by The Fragrance Foundation which honor the fragrance industry's creative achievements. Cher has won once.

!
|-
!scope="row"|2020
|Cher Eau de Couture|Consumer Choice of the Year - Women's Popular
|
|style="text-align:center;" |

Girls’ Choice Awards
The "Girls’ Choice Awards" is an annual event created by Girls' Choice, an empowerment platform led by young women to support the voices of young people and provide resources for today's most pressing issues. Cher has been nominated once.

!
|-
|2019
|Cher
|Girls' Choice Music Icon
|
|style="text-align:center;" |

GLAAD Media Awards
The GLAAD Media Awards is an accolade bestowed by the Gay & Lesbian Alliance Against Defamation (GLAAD) to recognize and honor various branches of the media for their outstanding representations of the lesbian, gay, bisexual and transgender (LGBT) community and the issues that affect their lives. Cher has been honored once.

!
|-
!scope="row"|1998
|Cher
|Vanguard Award
|
|style="text-align:center;" |

 Glamour Awards 
The Glamour Awards are hosted by Glamour magazine every year honoring extraordinary and inspirational women from a variety of fields, including entertainment, business, science, education, and politics. Cher has been honored once.

!
|-
|2010
|Cher
|Woman of the Year – Lifetime Achievement Award
|
|style="text-align:center;" |

Go-Set Pop Poll Awards
Teen-oriented pop music newspaper, Go-Set was established in February 1966 and conducted an annual poll during 1966 to 1972 of its readers to determine the most popular personalities. Cher has been nominated once.

!
|-
|1966
|Cher
|Female Vocal
|
|style="text-align:center;" |

Golden Apple Awards
The Golden Apple Awards have been presented annually since 1941 by the Hollywood Women's Press Club to entertainers, in recognition of their behavior, rather than performance. Cher has been nominated once.

!
|-
|1988
|Cher
|Female Star of the Year
|
|style="text-align:center;"|

Golden Globe Awards
The Golden Globe Awards is an American accolade bestowed by the 93 members of the Hollywood Foreign Press Association (HFPA), which recognizes excellence in film and television, both domestic and foreign. Cher has received three awards from six nominations.

!
|-
|1974
|The Sonny & Cher Comedy Hour|Best TV Actress – Comedy or Musical
|
|style="text-align:center;" rowspan="6"| 
|-
|1983
|Come Back to the Five and Dime, Jimmy Dean, Jimmy Dean|rowspan="2"|Best Actress in a Supporting Role – Motion Picture
|
|-
|1984
|Silkwood|
|-
|1986
|Mask|Best Actress in a Motion Picture – Drama
|
|-
|1988
|Moonstruck|Best Actress in a Motion Picture – Musical or Comedy
|
|-
|1997
|If These Walls Could Talk|Best Supporting Actress – Series, Miniseries or Television Film
|

 Cher was a featured vocalist on one Best Original Song winning song (You Haven't Seen the Last of Me in 2011) and two nominated songs (Alfie in 1967 and After All in 1989), but those nominations are credited to the songwriters and not the performer.

Grammy Awards
Grammy Awards
The Grammy Awards are awarded annually by the National Academy of Recording Arts and Sciences of the United States for outstanding achievements in the music industry. Often considered the highest music honor, the awards were established in 1958. Cher has received one award from seven nominations.

!
|-
|1966
|Sonny & Cher
|Best New Artist
|
|style="text-align:center;"| 
|-
|rowspan="2"|1972
|Gypsys, Tramps & Thieves|Best Female Pop Vocal Performance
|
|style="text-align:center;" rowspan="2"| 
|-
|All I Ever Need Is You  
|Best Pop Performance by a Duo or Group
|
|-
|rowspan="3"|2000
|rowspan="2"|"Believe"
|Best Dance Recording
|
|style="text-align:center;" rowspan="3"|
|-
|Record of the Year
|
|-
|Believe|Best Pop Vocal Album
|
|-
|2004
|Love One Another|Best Dance Recording
|
|style="text-align:center;"|

 Cher was a featured vocalist on one Grammy Award nominated song (You Haven't Seen the Last of Me) in the Best Song Written for Visual Media category, but the nomination is credited to the songwriter and not the performer.

Grammy Hall of Fame
The Grammy Hall of Fame is a hall of fame honoring musical recordings of lasting qualitative or historical significance. One of Sonny & Cher's singles was inducted in 2017.

!
|-
|rowspan="1"| 2017 ||rowspan="1"| I Got You Babe  || Grammy Hall of Fame || 
|style="text-align:center;"|

Guinness Book of British Hit Singles
British Hit Singles & Albums (originally known as The Guinness Book of British Hit Singles and The Guinness Book of British Hit Albums) is a music reference book originally published in the United Kingdom by the publishing arm of the Guinness breweries, Guinness Superlatives. Cher has been featured four times.

!
|-
| rowspan="4"| 2002
| rowspan="2"| Cher
| Top 100 Artists of All Time – #65
| 
|style="text-align:center;" rowspan="2"|
|-
| Oldest Solo Female Artist to Top the Charts
| 
|-
| rowspan="2"|Believe| Best-Selling Single by a Female Artist
| 
|style="text-align:center;" rowspan="2"|
|-
| Top 100 Singles of All Time – #84
| 
|-

Guinness Book of World Records
The Guinness World Records is a reference book published annually, containing a collection of world records. Cher has been honored twice.

!
|-
| 2002
| Cher
| Oldest Female Artist to Top the Billboard Hot 100 Chart
| 
|style="text-align:center;" rowspan="2"|
|-
| 2007
| Living Proof: The Farewell Tour| Highest Grossing Tour by a Female Artist of All Time
| 

Hasty Pudding Theatricals Awards
The Hasty Pudding Theatricals Awards were presented annually by the theatrical student society at Harvard University since 1951. Cher has been honored once.

!
|-
| 1985
| Cher
|Woman of the Year
| 
|style="text-align:center;" |

Hit Awards
The Hit Awards is a Norwegian honor presented annually to the most successful Norwegian and international artists. Cher has been nominated once.

!
|-
| 1999
| Cher
| International Artist of the Year
| 
|style="text-align:center;" |

Hollywood Music in Media Awards
The Hollywood Music in Media Awards (HMMA) recognizes and honors the music of visual mediums (films, TV, movie trailers, video games, commercials, etc.). Cher has received one nomination.

!
|-
!scope="row"|2017
|Prayers For This World|Best Original Song – Documentary
|
|style="text-align:center;"|

Hollywood Walk of Fame
The Hollywood Walk of Fame is a sidewalk along Hollywood Boulevard and Vine Street in Hollywood, California, with more than 2,000 five-pointed stars to honor artists for their achievement in the entertainment industry. Cher was selected for the honor in 1983, but she forfeited her opportunity by declining to schedule the mandatory personal appearance. She did attend the unveiling of the Sonny & Cher star in 1998 as a tribute to her recently deceased ex-husband, Sonny Bono.

!
|-
|1983
|Cher
| rowspan="2"|Hollywood Walk of Fame
|
|style="text-align:center;"|
|-
|1998
|Sonny & Cher
|
|style="text-align:center;" |
|}

Houston Film Critics Society Awards
The "Houston Film Critics Society" is a non-profit film critic organization in Houston, Texas. The group presents an annual set of film awards for "extraordinary accomplishment in film" in a ceremony held at the Museum of Fine Arts, Houston. Cher has been nominated once.

!
|-
|2010
|You Haven't Seen the Last of Me|Best Original Song
|
|style="text-align:center;"|

Hungarian Music Awards
The Hungarian Music Awards have been given to Hungarian and international artists in the field of music since 1992, and are the equivalent to the Grammy Awards in the US. Cher has won once.

!
|-
|2000
|Believe|Foreign Pop Album of the Year 
|
|style="text-align:center;"|

IFPI Platinum Europe Awards
The IFPI Platinum Europe Awards were founded in 1996 and are awarded in recognition of one million album retail sales across Europe. Cher has received three awards.

!
|-
| align="center"| 1998
| rowspan="2"| Believe|1× Platinum Europe Award
| 
|style="text-align:center;" rowspan="3"|
|-
|rowspan="2"| 1999
|4× Platinum Europe Award
| 
|-
| The Greatest Hits|2× Platinum Europe Award
| 
|-

International Dance Music Awards
The International Dance Music Awards was established in 1985. It is a part of the Winter Music Conference, a weeklong electronic music event held annually. Cher has won two awards.

!
|-
| rowspan="2"|1999
| rowspan="2"|Believe|Best Hi NRG 12"
| 
|style="text-align:center;" rowspan="2"|
|-
|Best Pop 12" Dance Record
| 
|-

International Documentary Association Awards
The International Documentary Association (IDA) Awards is an annual event that recognizes and honors outstanding documentary films and filmmakers. As an executive producer, Cher has won once.

!
|-
!scope="row"|2017
|Edith+Eddie|Best Documentary Short
|
|style="text-align:center;" |

IRMA Music Awards
The IRMA Music Awards were presented annually by the Irish Recorded Music Association to the most successful Irish and international artists. Since 2001, the IRMA Music Awards have been replaced by the annual Meteor Ireland Music Awards. Cher has won once.

!
|-
| 1992
| Cher
| International Female Artist
| 
|style="text-align:center;"|

Italian National Syndicate of Film Journalists – Silver Ribbon Award
The "Nastro d'Argento" (lit. Silver Ribbon) is an Italian film award awarded each year since 1946 by the Italian National Syndicate of Film Journalists. Cher has won once.

!
|-
|1988
|Moonstruck|Best Foreign Actress
|
|style="text-align:center;"|

iVillage Entertainment Awards
iVillage Entertainment Awards were a ceremony which recognized the actresses, actors, characters, scenes, shows, movies, and more, determining the winners by readers' votes. Cher has won once.

!
|-
|2011
|Cher
|The Most Welcome Celebrity Comeback
| 
|style="text-align:center;"|

Ivor Novello Awards
The Ivor Novello Awards celebrate, honor and reward excellence in British and Irish songwriting and composing. Cher has received three awards.

!
|-
| rowspan="3"| 1999
| rowspan="3"| Believe| International Hit of the Year
|
|style="text-align:center;" rowspan="3"|
|-
| Best Song Musically and Lyrically
|
|-
| Best Selling UK Single
|
|-

Jupiter Awards
The Jupiter Award is a German annual award that recognizes talent and achievement in film and television. Cher has been nominated for two awards.

!
|-
| align="center"| 1985
| Mask|rowspan="2"|Best International Actress
| 
|style="text-align:center;" rowspan="2"|
|-
| 1988
| Moonstruck| 
|-

Kansas City Critics Film Circle
The Kansas City Film Critics Circle was founded in 1966 as the Kansas City Film Circle Awards, and is the second oldest professional film critics' association in the United States, after the New York Film Critics Circle. Cher has won once.

!
|-
|1987
|Moonstruck|Best Actress
|
|style="text-align:center;"|

Kennedy Center Honors
The Kennedy Center Honors is an annual honor given to those in the performing arts for their lifetime of contributions to American culture. The honors have been presented annually since 1978, culminating each December in a star-studded gala celebrating the honorees in the Kennedy Center Opera House. Cher has been honored in 2018.

!
|-
|2018
|Cher
|Kennedy Center Honors
|
|style="text-align:center;"|

Kids' Choice Awards
The Kids' Choice Awards is an annual American children's awards ceremony show that is produced by Nickelodeon. The show honors the year's biggest television, movie, and music acts as voted by viewers worldwide of Nickelodeon networks. Cher has been nominated once.

!
|-
|1990
|Cher
|Favorite Female Musician
| 
|style="text-align:center;"| 

KRLA Beat International Pop Music Awards
KRLA Beat was an American rock music magazine that operated between 1964 and 1968. During its run it issued awards honoring the most successful artists of the year. Cher has won three awards.

!
|-
| rowspan="3"|1966
| rowspan="2"| Cher
|Female Vocalist
|
|style="text-align:center;" rowspan="3"|
|-
|New Female Vocalist
|
|-
|Sonny & Cher
|Duo
|
|}

Lab School of Washington Awards
The Lab School of Washington is a private school in Washington, D.C. for students with learning differences, established in 1967 by Sally Smith. Each year, the school invites people who have learning difficulties to the school and gives them an award for working through their difficulties and any academic-related challenges they face in their careers. Cher has been honored in 1985.

!
|-
|1985
|Cher
|Outstanding Learning Disabled Achiever Award 
| 
|style="text-align:center;"|

Las Vegas Awards
The Las Vegas Awards "A Tribute to Jimmy Durante", known as the "Jimmies", were presented annually to honor top Las Vegas performers. Cher has received one nomination.

!
|-
| 1980
| Cher
| Female Musical Star
| 
|style="text-align:center;"|

Los Angeles Film Critics Association Awards
The Los Angeles Film Critics Association (LAFCA) is an American film critic organization founded in 1975. The organization votes on the Los Angeles Film Critics Association Awards, honoring members of the film industry who have excelled in their fields over the calendar year. Cher has won the second place award twice.

!
|-
|1982
| Come Back to the Five and Dime, Jimmy Dean, Jimmy Dean| Best Supporting Actress
|
|style="text-align:center;"|
|-
|1983
|Silkwood|Best Supporting Actress
|
|style="text-align:center;"|

Los Angeles Music Awards
The Los Angeles Music Awards, previously known as Pro Set L.A. Music Awards, were created to honor and pay tribute to the diversity and depth of the L.A. music scene and have honored numerous celebrities and organizations from every genre of the entertainment industry. Cher has won once.

!
|-
|1992
|Cher
|Best Female Pop Vocalist
|
|style="text-align:center;"|

Los Premios 40 Principales
The Los Premios 40 Principales is an award show by the musical radio station Los 40 hosted in Spain since 2006. Cher has been honored once.

!
|-
!scope="row"|2010
|Cher
|Lifetime Achievement Award
|
|style="text-align:center;" |

Lunas del Auditorio
Lunas del Auditorio are sponsored by The National Auditorium in Mexico to honor the best live shows in the country. Cher has received one nomination.

!
|-
|2005
|Cher
|Best Foreign Language Pop Artist
|
|style="text-align:center;"|

Melody Maker Pop Poll Awards
Melody Maker was a British weekly music magazine, one of the world's earliest music weeklies. The magazine ran poll awards each year, honoring the top voted UK and international artists. Cher has been nominated once.

!
|-
!scope="row"|1967
|Cher
|International Girl Singer
|
|style="text-align:center;"|

Midem's Dance d'Or
The Midem's Dance d'Or is an annual dance music awards ceremony held in Cannes, France. Cher has won once.

!
|-
!scope="row"|1999
|Believe|Best International Single
|
|style="text-align:center;"|

Millicent Waldron Award
The Millicent Waldron Award, named after the accomplished TV anchor and fashion designer, were given during International Beauty Show to individuals to celebrate fashion and style. Sonny and Cher were honored once.

!
|-
!scope="row"|1973
|Sonny & Cher
|Spectacular Costumes Award
|
|style="text-align:center;" |

Mnet Asian Music Awards
Mnet Asian Music Awards, otherwise abbreviated as MAMA, is an award show held by Mnet annually that credits South Korean artists, as well as foreign artists who have had an impact in the South Korean Music industry. Cher has been nominated once.

!
|-
|align="center"| 1999
|Cher
|Best International Artist
|
|style="text-align:center;"|
|}

MOA JukeBox Awards
Music Operators of America (MOA) association honored the most played jukebox artists in the US. As part of Sonny & Cher, she has won once.

!
|-
|1972
|Sonny & Cher
|Artists of the Year
|
|style="text-align:center;"|

MTV Awards
MTV Australia Awards
The MTV Australia Awards started in 2005 and were Australia's first awards show to celebrate both local and international acts. Cher has received one honorary award.

!
|-
| 2005
|Cher
|VH1 Music First Award
|
|style="text-align:center;" |

MTV O Music Awards
The MTV O Music Awards is one of the major annual awards established by MTV to honor the art, creativity, personality and technology of music into the digital space. Cher has received one nomination.

!
|-
| 2011
|Cher
|Must Follow Artist on Twitter
|
|style="text-align:center;"|

MTV Video Music Awards
The MTV Video Music Awards, commonly abbreviated as VMA, were established in 1984 by MTV to celebrate the top music videos of the year. Cher has received two nominations.

!
|-
| 
| I Found Someone| Best Female Video
| 
|style="text-align:center;"|
|-
| 
|Believe| Best Dance Video
| 
|style="text-align:center;"|
|- 

Music Control Airplay Awards
The Music Control Airplay Awards (MCAW) is a music prize in Sweden, awarded to the most played artists on the Swedish radio. Cher has received one award.

!
|-
|1999
|Cher
|Most Played International Artist
|
|style="text-align:center;"|

Music & Media Year-End Awards
Music & Media year-end awards were based on statistics from the Eurochart Hot 100 Singles and European Top 100 Albums. The awards were handed to most successful artists in Europe. Cher has received seven awards.

!
|-
| rowspan="2"| 1991
| rowspan="7"| Cher
|Top Female Artist (Albums)
|
|style="text-align:center;" rowspan="2"|
|-
|Top Female Artist (Singles)
| 
|-
| rowspan="4"| 1999
|Top 10 Artists (Albums)
|
|style="text-align:center;" rowspan="4"|
|-
|Top 10 Artists (Singles)
| 
|-
|Top 10 Female Artists (Albums)
| 
|-
|Top 10 Female Artists (Singles)
| 
|-
| 2000
|Top 10 Female Artists (Albums)
| 
|style="text-align:center;"|
|-

NARM Awards
The National Association of Recording Merchandisers is a United States non-profit organisation that serves music retailing businesses in lobbying and trade promotion. Cher has been nominated three times.

!
|-
| rowspan="2"|1966
|Cher
|Most Promising Female Vocalist
|
|style="text-align:center;" rowspan="2"|
|-
|Sonny & Cher
|Best Selling American Vocal Group
|
|-
|1967
|Cher
|Most Promising Female Vocalist
|
|style="text-align:center;"|
|-

National Society of Film Critics Awards, USA – NSFC Award
The National Society of Film Critics (NSFC) is an American film critic organization, and its annual awards are one of the most prestigious film critics awards in the United States. Cher has won the second place award once. 

!
|-
|1984
|Silkwood|Best Supporting Actress
|
|style="text-align:center;"|

New Mexico Film Critics Awards
The Mexico Film Critics Awards is a film critic organization founded in 2016 and is given annually to honor excellence in cinema worldwide. Cher has won the second place award once.

!
|-
|2017
|Prayers For This World|Best Original Song
|
|style="text-align:center;"|

New York Festivals TV and Film Awards
New York Festivals are a collection of related annual arts and media awards based in New York City. Cher has won once.

!
|-
|2022
|Cher and the Loneliest Elephant|Best Documentary - Heroes, Gold Award 
|
|style="text-align:center;"|

New York Film Critics Circle Awards
The New York Film Critics Circle (NYFCC) is an American film critic organization founded in 1935. The New York Film Critics Circle Awards are given annually to honor excellence in cinema worldwide of the calendar year. Cher has won the second place award once.

!
|-
|1983
|Silkwood|Best Supporting Actress
|
|style="text-align:center;"|

Nielsen Broadcast Data System Awards
The Nielsen Broadcast Data System, better known as BDS, is a service that tracks monitored radio, television and internet airplay of songs based on the number of spins and detections. Since early 2000s they have awarded the BDS certified awards to most played songs on the radio. Cher has received one award.

!
|-
| 2002
| Believe| 400,000 Spins Award
| 
|style="text-align:center;" |

NME Awards
The "NME Awards" is an annual music awards show in the United Kingdom, founded by the music magazine "NME" ("New Musical Express"). The nominations and eventual winners are voted for by the readers of the magazine who then performed at the NME Poll Winners Concert. As a solo artist and as part of Sonny & Cher, she has received six nominations.

!
|-
| rowspan="2"| 1965
| Cher
| World Female Singer
| 
|style="text-align:center;" rowspan="2"|
|-
| rowspan="2"|Sonny & Cher
| rowspan="2| World Vocal Group
| 
|-
| rowspan="2"| 1966
| 
|style="text-align:center;" rowspan="2"|
|-
| rowspan="3"| Cher
| rowspan="3"| World Female Singer
| 
|-
| 1967
| 
|style="text-align:center;"|
|-
| 1971
| 
|style="text-align:center;"|

NRJ Music Awards
The NRJ Music Awards were created in 2000 by the radio station NRJ in partnership with the television network TF1.
Cher has received three nominations.

!
|-
| rowspan="3"| 2000
| Cher
| International Female Artist of the Year
| 
|style="text-align:center;" rowspan="3"|
|-
| Believe| International Song of the Year
| 
|-
| Believe| International Album of the Year
| 
|-

Online Film & Television Association
The Online Film & Television Association or the OFTA Awards, is an annual awards ceremony in which Outstanding Achievement in film and television is honored. The presentation of these awards began in 1996. Cher has won once from three nominations.

!
|-
|1997
| If These Walls Could Talk| Best Direction of a Motion Picture or Miniseries
| 
|style="text-align:center;"|
|-
|2000
| Cher – Live in Concert| Best Host or Performer of a Variety, Musical, or Comedy Special
| 
|style="text-align:center;"|
|-
|2019
| Fernando| Best Adapted Song
| 
|style="text-align:center;"|

People's Choice Awards
Created by Bob Stivers, the People's Choice Awards are an annual award show that recognizes figures from popular culture and are voted on by the general public. Cher has won once from seven nominations.

!
|-
| rowspan="2"|1976
|rowspan="6"|Cher
|Favorite Female Television Performer
| 
|style="text-align:center;" rowspan="2"|
|-
|Favorite All Around Female Entertainer
| 
|-
|1988
|Favorite Motion Picture Actress
| 
|style="text-align:center;"|
|-
|1989
|Favorite All-Around Female Star
| 
|style="text-align:center;"|
|-
|1990
| rowspan="2"|Favorite All-Around Female Entertainer
| 
|style="text-align:center;" |
|-
|1991
| 
|style="text-align:center;" |
|-
|2019
|Here We Go Again Tour|Favorite Concert Tour
| 
|style="text-align:center;" |

Pollstar Awards
The Pollstar Concert Industry Awards aim to reward the best in the business of shows and concerts. Cher has received four nominations.

!
|-
|2000
|Do You Believe? Tour| rowspan="2"|Most Creative Stage Production
|
|style="text-align:center;"|
|-
|2002
|rowspan="3"|Living Proof: The Farewell Tour|
|style="text-align:center;"|
|-
| rowspan="2"|2003
|Major Tour of the Year
|
|style="text-align:center;" rowspan="2"|
|-
|Most Creative Stage Production
|

Pop Music Survey Awards
Pop Music Survey Awards were founded by Bobby Poe in 1968 and were carried out until 1996 honoring the artists of the Top 40 record charts and radio.Cher has been nominated three times.

!
|-
| rowspan="2"|1974
| Cher
| Female Artist of the Year
| 
|style="text-align:center;" rowspan="2"|
|-
| Half Breed| Record of the Year
| 
|-
|1975
| Cher
| Female Artist of the Year
| 
|style="text-align:center;"|
|-

Premios Amigo
The Premios Amigo is a music award ceremony in Spain, presented annually by Productores de Música de España since 1997. Cher has won two awards.

!
|-
| rowspan="2"| 1999
| Cher
| Best International Female Solo Artist
| 
|style="text-align:center;" rowspan="2"|
|-
| Believe| Best International Album
| 

Premios Ondas
The Premios Ondas have been given since 1954 by Radio Barcelona, a subsidiary of Cadena SER, in recognition of professionals in the fields of radio and television broadcasting, the cinema, and the music industry. Cher has been honored once.

!
|-
| 2001
| Cher
| Lifetime Achievement Award
| 
|style="text-align:center;" |

PRS Awards
British Performing Right Society (PRS) recognizes the UK publishers and artists whose songs are among the most performed in the US. Cher has won once.

!
|-
|1999
| Believe| Club Play Award
| 
|style="text-align:center;"|

Queerty Awards
The Queerty awards or "Queerties" were established in 2012 to honor the "best of LGBTQ Media and Culture". Cher has been nominated two times.

!
|-
| rowspan="2"|2019
|Cher
| Badass
|
|style="text-align:center;"| 
|-
|Gimme! Gimme! Gimme! (A Man After Midnight)
| Queer Anthem
| 
|style="text-align:center;"| 
|-

Quigley Publication Awards
Quigley Publication Awards were an annual poll conducted by Quigley Publications among Television Critics of the United States. Cher has won four second place awards.

!
|-
| rowspan="4"|1974
| Cher
| Best Female Vocalist
|
|style="text-align:center;" rowspan="4" |
|-
| Sonny & Cher
| Best Comedy Team
|
|-
| rowspan="2"|The Sonny & Cher Comedy Hour|Best Variety Program
|
|-
|Best Musical Show
|
|-

Razzie Awards
The Golden Raspberry Awards or the Razzies are awarded in recognition of the worst in film. Cher has been nominated once.

!
|-
|2011
| Burlesque| Worst Supporting Actress
| 
|style="text-align:center;"|

Record Mirror Poll Awards
The Record Mirror was a British weekly music newspaper between 1954 and 1991, it conducted annual poll awards where the winners were chosen by the UK public. Cher finished 2nd in the 1966 poll, and was among top-voted in 1967 and 1972.

!
|-
| rowspan="3"|1966
| rowspan="2"|Cher
| World Female Vocalist
|
| rowspan="3"style="text-align:center;"|
|-
|Best Dressed
|
|-
|I Got You Babe|World's Best Disc
|
|-
| rowspan="2"|1967
|Cher
| World Female Vocalist
|
| rowspan="2"style="text-align:center;"|
|-
|Sonny & Cher
|World Mixed Group
|
|-
| rowspan="2"|1972
|Cher
| World Female Vocalist
|
| rowspan="2"style="text-align:center;"|
|-
|Sonny & Cher
|World Mixed Group
|
|-

Record of the Year
The Record of the Year was an award voted by the UK public. The award began in 1998, and was televised on ITV before being dropped in 2006 after disagreements over the phone voting element. Since then it has been an online poll, administered through the Record of the Year website. In 2013, it was axed, signaling the end of the award. Cher was nominated once.

!
|-
!scope="row"|1998
|Believe|The Record of the Year
|
|style="text-align:center;" |

Record World Awards
Record World magazine was one of the three main music industry trade magazines in the United States, along with Billboard and Cash Box magazines, founded in 1946 and published until 1982. The Record World Awards were an annual award given to most successful artists in the US. Cher, both solo and with Sonny, has been listed fifteen times.

!
|-
| rowspan="3"| 1965
|I Got You Babe 
| Top Record – #1
|
|style="text-align:center;" rowspan="3"|
|-
| rowspan="2"| Sonny & Cher 
| Top Duo (Albums) – #1
|
|-
| Most Promising Duo (Singles) – #1
|
|-
| rowspan="2"| 1966
|Cher
| Top Female Vocalist (Singles) – #2
|
|style="text-align:center;" rowspan="2"|
|-
| Sonny & Cher 
| Top Duo (Singles) – #1
|
|-
| 1968
| rowspan="2"|Cher
|Top Female Vocalist (Singles) – #5
|
|style="text-align:center;|
|-
| rowspan="2"| 1971
|Top Female Vocalist (Singles) – #5
|
|style="text-align:center;" rowspan="2"|
|-
| Sonny & Cher 
| Top Duo (Albums) – #3
|
|-
| rowspan="3"| 1972
|Cher
|Top Female Vocalist (Singles) – #7
|
|style="text-align:center;" rowspan="3"|
|-
| rowspan="2"| Sonny & Cher 
| Top Duo (Singles) – #3
|
|-
| Top Duo (Albums) – #4
|
|-
| rowspan="2"| 1973
|Half Breed|Top Record – #6
|
|style="text-align:center;" rowspan="2"|
|-
| rowspan="3"| Cher 
| Top Female Vocalist (Singles) – #4
|
|-
| rowspan="2"|  1979
| Top Female Vocalist (Singles) – #10
|
|style="text-align:center;" rowspan="2"|
|-
| Top Disco Female Artist – #20
|
|-

Rockbjörnen
The Rockbjörnen is a music award ceremony in Sweden, established in 1979 by the Aftonbladet, one of the largest newspapers in Nordic countries. Cher has received one award.

!
|-
|1998
|Believe|Foreign Song of the Year
|
|style="text-align:center;"|

Sant Jordi Awards
The Sant Jordi Awards are film awards presented each year for cinematic performances in Barcelona, Spain since 1957. Cher has been nominated once.

!
|-
|1989
|Moonstruck|Best Foreign Actress
|
|style="text-align:center;" |

Satellite Awards
Voted for by the International Press Academy, the Satellite Awards are held annually and honor achievements in television and film. Cher has won once from two nominations.

!
|-
|1997
| If These Walls Could Talk| Best Supporting Actress – Series, Miniseries or Television Film
| 
|style="text-align:center;"|
|-
|2010
|You Haven't Seen the Last of Me|Best Original Song
| 
|style="text-align:center;"|
|-
|2017
|Prayers For This World|Best Original Song
| 
|style="text-align:center;"|

Shidurei Israel Radio Awards
The annual poll awards based on listeners' votes of the Israel's public domestic and international radio service Shidurei Israel Radio. Cher has won once.

!
|-
| 1975
| Cher
| Best Female Singer
| 
|style="text-align:center;"|

Shorty Awards
The Shorty Awards, also known as the "Shortys", is an annual awards event, recognizing the people and organizations producing real-time short form content across social web. Cher has been nominated twice.

!
|-
| 2016
| rowspan="2"|Cher
|Best Singer on Social Media
|
|style="text-align:center;"|
|-
| 2017
|Best Celebrity on Social Media
|
|style="text-align:center;"|
|-

Silver State Awards
Created in 2013, the "Silver State Awards" honors and recognizes excellence and exemplary achievements by individuals and companies in the great state of Nevada. Cher has been nominated once.

!
|-
|2017
|Cher
|Entertainer of the Year
|
|style="text-align:center;"|

 Smash Hits Poll Winners Party 
The Smash Hits Poll Winners Party (1988–2005) was an awards ceremony held annually by British magazine Smash Hits, and broadcast on BBC One. Cher has received multiple nominations.

!
|-
| align="center" rowspan="3"|1991
|Cher
|Best Female Solo Singer
|
|style="text-align:center;"|
|-
|Love Hurts|Best LP
|
| align="center" rowspan="2"style="text-align:center;"|
|-
|The Shoop Shoop Song (It's in His Kiss)
|Best Pop Video
|
|-

Spirit of Katharine Hepburn Awards
The Spirit of Katharine Hepburn Award is given by the Katharine Hepburn Cultural Arts Center, also known as the Kate, to an individual who embodies the spirit, independence, and character of the legendary actress. Cher has been awarded in 2020.

!
|-
|2020
|Cher
|Spirit of Katharine Hepburn Award
|
|style="text-align:center;" |

TCL Chinese Theatre Handprint Ceremony
The TCL Chinese Theatre Handprint Ceremony honors popular motion picture personalities from the 1920s to the present day by having their handprints, foorprints and autographs in the concrete of the Grauman's Chinese Theatre's forecourt. Cher has been honored in 2010.

!
|-
!scope="row"|2010
|Cher
|Handprints and Footprints Ceremony
|
|style="text-align:center;" |

TMF Awards
Broadcast by The Music Factory channel in Belgium, the TMF Awards awarded the achievements in the music scene of the Dutch-speaking regions to local and international artists. Cher has been nominated twice.

!
|-
| align="center" rowspan="2"| 1999
| Cher
| Best Female Singer (Foreign)
| 
|style="text-align:center;" rowspan="2"|
|-
| Believe
| Best Single (Foreign)
| 
|-

TV Land Awards
The TV Land Awards is an American television awards ceremony that generally commemorates shows now off the air, rather than in current production as with the Emmys. Cher has won once from two nominations.

!
|-
|2006
| rowspan="2"|Sonny & Cher on Late Night with David Letterman
| rowspan="2"|TV's Greatest Music Moment
| 
|style="text-align:center;"|
|-
|-
|2007
| 
|style="text-align:center;"|
|-

US International Film and Video Festival
The US International Film and Video Festival's yearly awards competition, founded in 1968 devoted exclusively to the yearly selection and recognition of outstanding Business, Television, Film and Video Productions. Cher has won once.

!
|-
|1999
|Believe
|First Place: Gold Camera Award
|
|style="text-align:center;"|

US Magazine Annual Readers' Poll Awards
The Us Weekly magazine is a celebrity and entertainment magazine based in New York City founded in 1977. Their Annual Readers' Poll awards commenced in 1982. Cher has won once out of two nominations.

!
|-
|1982
|rowspan="2"|Cher
|Favorite Variety Star of the Year
|
|style="text-align:center;"|
|-
|1988
|Sexiest Female Star of the Year
|
|style="text-align:center;"|

Vegas Magazine Awards
The Vegas Magazine Awards were presented annually to honor top Las Vegas performers. Cher has won once.

!
|-
| 1981
| Cher
| Female Performer of the Year 
| 
|style="text-align:center;"|

VSDA Awards
The Video Software Dealers Association's VSDA Awards for home entertainment video releases of the year are held annually since 1981 in Las Vegas. Cher has won once.

!
|-
|1992
| Cher Fitness: A New Attitude
| Health and Fitness Homer Award
| 
|style="text-align:center;"|

White Party Palm Springs Awards
The White Party Palm Springs recognizes individuals for their unique and varied achievements in order to promote equality and help the LGBT community. Cher has been honored once.

!
|-
!scope="row"|2014
|Cher
|Icon Award
|
|style="text-align:center;" |

Women's Image Awards
Since 1993, Women's Image Network (WIN) has produced The Women's Image Network Awards to honor artists and others who create dimensional female media images. Cher has won once.

!
|-
| 2013
| Dear Mom, Love Cher
| Best TV Show Produced by a Woman
| 
|style="text-align:center;"|

Women in Film Crystal + Lucy Awards
First presented in 1977 by the Women in Film organization, Women in Film Crystal + Lucy Awards are presented to honor women in communications and media. Cher has won once.

!
|-
|2000
|Cher
|Lucy Award
|
|style="text-align:center;" |

Women's World Awards
Sponsored by the World Awards organization headed by former Soviet Union President Mikhail Gorbachev, the Women's World Awards were intended for women who have influenced the world by their work in areas such as society or politics. Cher has been honored once.

!
|-
| 2004
| Cher
| World Arts Award
| 
|style="text-align:center;" |

World Music Awards
The World Music Award is an international awards show founded in 1989 that annually honors recording artists based on worldwide sales figures provided by the International Federation of the Phonographic Industry (IFPI). Cher has received six nominations in the competitive categories and has received an honorary Legend Award in 1999.

!
|-
| 1999
| rowspan="4"| Cher
| Legend Award for Outstanding Contribution to the Music Industry
|
|style="text-align:center;" |
|-
| rowspan="6"| 2014
| World's Best Female Artist
|
|style="text-align:center;" rowspan="6"|
|-
| World's Best Live Act
| 
|-
| World's Best Entertainer of the Year
|
|-
| Closer to the Truth
| World's Best Album
|
|-
| rowspan="2"| Woman's World
|World's Best Song
|
|-
| World's Best Video
|
|-

World Soundtrack Awards
The World Soundtrack Awards is a ceremony aimed at organizing and overseeing the educational, cultural and professional aspects of the art of film music, including the preservation of the history of the soundtrack and its worldwide promotion. Cher has received one nomination.

!
|-
|2010
|You Haven't Seen the Last of Me
|Best Original Song
| 
|style="text-align:center;"|

WLS Radio Hit Parade Awards
The annual Hit Parade Awards honorees were chosen by the listeners of Chicago's WLS Radio. Cher has won twice.

!
|-
| rowspan="2"| 1968
| Cher
| Best Female
| 
|style="text-align:center;" rowspan="2"|
|-
| Sonny & Cher
| Best Duet
| 
|-

XM Nation Music Awards
The XM Nation Music Awards were an annual event organized by XM Satellite Radio, the US leading satellite radio service. Cher has won once.

!
|-
|2005
|Cher
|Most Likely to Have Another "Final" Tour Award
|
|style="text-align:center;"|

Your Choice For The Film Awards
The Your Choice For The Film Awards honored the best in film as chosen by national moviegoers poll to determine the public's favorite movies and actors of the year. Cher has won once.

!
|-
|1986
|Mask
|Best Actress 
|
|style="text-align:center;"|

Žebřík Music Awards
The Žebřík Music Awards also known as Music Ladder Awards is an annual music awards given to the best musicians and bands in Czech Republic. Cher has been nominated once.

!Ref.
|-
| 1993
| Cher
| Best International Female
| 
|

Other Recognitions, Career Achievements and Milestones

Billboard Magazine

People Magazine

Rolling Stone Magazine

VH1

Miscellaneous
The GRAMMY Magazine featured Cher on their "10 Trendsetting Double Threats Who Have Conquered Both Music & Film" list.
MTV ranked Cher at #2 on their Top 40 Musicians-Turned-Actors list.
Featured on the "Top 10 Pop Music Divas of All Time" list published by About.com.
Ranked #3 on MetroNOW's "Top 50 Gay Icons" by MetroSource.
Sonny and Cher were ranked #34 on Blender Magazine's "50 Hottest Rock & Roll Couples of All Time" list.
Bravo's program "Great Things About Being..." ranked Cher #1 as "the greatest thing about being gay" on their countdown.
In 2000 Entertainment Weekly featured Cher on their "The 100 Greatest Entertainers" list.
In 2013 Cher was ranked #5 on "Influential Female Singers of the 1970s" list by HubPages.
In 2017 Cher was included in Fast Company's prestigious "Most Creative People in Business" list.
Ranked #44 on "The 75 Greatest Women of All Time" by Esquire magazine.
Ranked #67 on "The 100 Hottest Female Singers of All Time" list compiled by New York–based media platform Complex.
In a poll by A&E's "Biography Magazine" Cher was ranked as people's #3 favorite actress of all time behind her two Hollywood idols, Katharine Hepburn and Audrey Hepburn.
"Believe" was voted as the world's eighth favorite song in a poll released by BBC.
In March 1975 Cher appeared on the cover of "Time" magazine, becoming one of handful female singers to do so.
American Film Institute ranked "Moonstruck" #8 on its "Top 10 Romantic Comedies" list.
The US media company Mental Floss ranked "Believe" at #2 on their "The 25 Most Powerful Songs of the Past 25 Years" list.
In November 1999 "The Advocate" magazine named Cher as one of the "25 Coolest Women".
In 2003 Cher received a special award for 6 sold-out shows at the Madison Square Garden, New York.
In 1988 Cher became the first artist to win an Academy Award for acting and have an album certified by the RIAA (Gold for "Cher") in the same year.
In 2019 Cher received a special award at the O2 Arena in London, UK, as recognition of her performances at the venue.
Cher is one of five actor-singers to have had a number-one single on the Billboard Hot 100 chart and won an acting Academy Award.
Cher is one of the highest grossing female artists of all time, with the gross of over $650 million.
Cher has sold more than 100 million records worldwide and is recognized as one of the world's top-selling female recording artists of all time.

Notes
A  Awards in certain categories do not have prior nominations and only winners are announced by the jury. For simplification and to avoid errors, each award in this list has been presumed to have had a prior nomination.

See also
Honorific nicknames in popular music
List of artists who reached number one in the United States
List of best-selling music artists
List of Billboard number-one dance hits
List of million-selling singles in the United Kingdom

References

External links
 various top lists (Ad free)

Awards
Cher
Cher